The Paralithodes californiensis, also known as the spiny king crab and the California king crab, is a species of king crab found in the East Pacific.

References

External links
 

Fauna of California
King crabs
Crustaceans of the eastern Pacific Ocean
Edible crustaceans
Commercial crustaceans
Crustaceans described in 1895